Eristhenodes is a genus of moths in the family Gelechiidae. It contains the species Eristhenodes tetrapetra, which is found in Argentina.

References

Gelechiinae